Mirna Sucely Ortiz Flores (born 28 February 1987) is a Guatemalan racewalker.

Having begun in the sport in 1998, she won a Central American youth title in 2000, and was a promising young athlete in her discipline, but due to financial hardship, she had to abandon the sport at the age of 14. She then returned to a competitive level in 2011, urged by coach Rigoberto Medina. Her return proved to be fruitful as in September 2011 she earned second place in the National Polish Championship in Varsovia, thereby qualifying for the 2012 Olympic Games, and a few weeks later she won the silver medal at the 2011 Pan American Games, behind her compatriot Jamy Franco in a race they both led from start to end.

On 18 March 2012 she set the 20 km record for the North, Central American, and Caribbean region at 1:28:54 at the Memorial Mario Albisetti in Lugano, Switzerland, where she came in second.

In the 2012 Olympic games in London she competed in the 20 km walk along the other two women of the Guatemala racewalking team, Jamy Franco and Mayra Herrera but was disqualified after 8 km.

After the World Championships that took place in Moscow in August 2013, she married racewalker Érick Barrondo.

She has qualified to represent Guatemala at the 2020 Summer Olympics. She will be a flag bearer for Guatemala during the Parade of Nations.

Personal bests

International competitions

References

External links
 
 
 

Living people
1987 births
Guatemalan female racewalkers
Olympic athletes of Guatemala
Athletes (track and field) at the 2012 Summer Olympics
Athletes (track and field) at the 2016 Summer Olympics
Pan American Games medalists in athletics (track and field)
Athletes (track and field) at the 2011 Pan American Games
Athletes (track and field) at the 2015 Pan American Games
Athletes (track and field) at the 2019 Pan American Games
World Athletics Championships athletes for Guatemala
Pan American Games silver medalists for Guatemala
Central American and Caribbean Games gold medalists for Guatemala
Central American Games gold medalists for Guatemala
Central American Games medalists in athletics
Competitors at the 2014 Central American and Caribbean Games
Central American and Caribbean Games medalists in athletics
Medalists at the 2011 Pan American Games
Medalists at the 2019 Pan American Games
Sportspeople from Guatemala City
Athletes (track and field) at the 2020 Summer Olympics
20th-century Guatemalan women
21st-century Guatemalan women